Robert H. Dollas (born January 31, 1965) is a Canadian former professional ice hockey player. Dollas played defence for the Winnipeg Jets, Quebec Nordiques, Detroit Red Wings, Mighty Ducks of Anaheim, Edmonton Oilers, Pittsburgh Penguins, Calgary Flames, Ottawa Senators and San Jose Sharks.

Playing career
As a youth, Dollas played in the 1978 Quebec International Pee-Wee Hockey Tournament with a minor ice hockey team from Châteauguay.

Dollas played junior hockey with the Laval Voisins and scored 61 points as a major junior rookie in 1982-83. During the 1983-84 season, Dollas made his NHL debut, playing in a single game with Winnipeg before being returned to junior and scoring 45 points in 54 games for the Voisins. The Voisins were the QMJHL champions that year, but they failed to win the Memorial Cup. Drafted 14th overall by the Jets in the 1983 NHL Entry Draft, Dollas played 646 regular season NHL games, scoring 42 goals and 96 assists for 138 points and collecting 467 penalty minutes in a career which spanned 16 seasons. Dollas won a gold medal with Canada at the 1985 World Junior Championships and was a tournament All-Star. Dollas is currently a radio commentator with TSN 690 on Montreal Canadiens broadcasts, and is an instructor with PSL Hockey in Laval, Quebec.

Career statistics

Regular season and playoffs

International

References

External links

1965 births
Living people
Adirondack Red Wings players
Calgary Flames players
Canadian ice hockey defencemen
Detroit Red Wings players
Fredericton Express players
Halifax Citadels players
Ice hockey people from Montreal
Laval Voisins players
Long Beach Ice Dogs (IHL) players
Manitoba Moose (IHL) players
Mighty Ducks of Anaheim players
Moncton Hawks players
National Hockey League first-round draft picks
Ottawa Senators players
Pittsburgh Penguins players
Quebec Nordiques players
San Jose Sharks players
Sherbrooke Canadiens players
Winnipeg Jets (1979–1996) draft picks
Winnipeg Jets (1979–1996) players